Hugh Hamon Massie (11 April 1854 – 12 October 1938) was a cricketer who played for New South Wales and Australia.  

Massie's role in the 1882 Ashes Test at The Oval was almost as pivotal in deciding the result as Fred Spofforth's celebrated performance with the ball. With Alick Bannerman as his opening partner, the hard-hitting Massie scored 55 in 57 minutes from just sixty deliveries, with nine fours, to give the Australians a chance. They duly took the match to win by seven runs. 

His son Jack Massie was a noted New South Wales cricketer in the 1910s.

See also
 List of New South Wales representative cricketers

References

External links
 

1854 births
1938 deaths
Australia Test cricketers
Australia Test cricket captains
New South Wales cricketers
Australian cricketers
Cricketers from Victoria (Australia)
Marylebone Cricket Club cricketers
Gentlemen of England cricketers
People from Port Fairy